In enzymology, a L-idonate 5-dehydrogenase is an enzyme that catalyzes the chemical reaction

L-idonate + NAD(P)+  5-dehydrogluconate + NAD(P)H + H+

The 3 substrates of this enzyme are L-idonate, NAD+, and NADP+, whereas its 4 products are 5-dehydrogluconate, NADH, NADPH, and H+.

This enzyme belongs to the family of oxidoreductases, specifically those acting on the CH-OH group of donor with NAD+ or NADP+ as acceptor. The systematic name of this enzyme class is L-idonate:NAD(P)+ oxidoreductase.

References

 

EC 1.1.1
NADPH-dependent enzymes
NADH-dependent enzymes
Enzymes of unknown structure